Crew Cuts may refer to:
 The Crew-Cuts, the Canadian vocal quartet
 Crew Cuts (company), the New York-based post-production company

See also
Crew cut, a type of haircut